The 2017–18 Pittsburgh Penguins season was the 51st season for the National Hockey League ice hockey team that was established on June 5, 1967. They entered the season as two-time defending Stanley Cup champions. It was the first season since the 2002–03 season in which the team played without goaltender Marc-Andre Fleury, as they shipped him off to play for the Vegas Golden Knights in the expansion draft. The Penguins failed to defend their title, after being eliminated in the Second Round of the playoffs by the eventual Stanley Cup champion Washington Capitals, ending their chances of a possible three-peat, the first three-peat in the NHL since the New York Islanders won 4 straight from 1980 to 1983, and the first in a North American professional sports league since the NBA’s Los Angeles Lakers from 2000 to 2002. As of 2023, this represents the most recent season the Pens have won a playoff series.

Standings

Schedule and results

Preseason
The preseason schedule was released on June 19, 2017.

|- style="background:#ffc;"
| 1 || September 19 || Pittsburgh || 3–4  || Buffalo || Pegula Ice Arena || — || 0–0–1
|- style="background:#cfc;"
| 2 || September 20 || Detroit || 5–6  || Pittsburgh || PPG Paints Arena || 17,784 || 1–0–1
|- style="background:#cfc;"
| 3 || September 22 || Pittsburgh || 4–3 || Columbus || Nationwide Arena || 12,115 || 2–0–1
|- style="background:#fcf;"
| 4 || September 24 || St. Louis || 4–1 || Pittsburgh || UPMC Lemieux Sports Complex || 1,500 || 2–1–1
|- style="background:#fcf;"
| 5 || September 25 || Pittsburgh || 1–4 || Detroit || Little Caesars Arena || 16,770 || 2–2–1
|- style="background:#cfc;"
| 6 || September 27 || Buffalo || 4–5 || Pittsburgh || PPG Paints Arena || 17,693 || 3–2–1
|- style="background:#fcf;"
| 7 || September 30 || Columbus || 3–0 || Pittsburgh || PPG Paints Arena || 18,338 || 3–3–1
|-

|- style="text-align:center;"
| Legend:       = Win       = Loss       = OT/SO Loss

Regular season
The regular season schedule was published on June 22, 2017.

|- style="background:#ffc;"
| 1 || October 4 || St. Louis || 5–4  || Pittsburgh || PPG Paints Arena || 18,652 || 0–0–1 || 1
|- style="background:#fcf;"
| 2 || October 5 || Pittsburgh || 1–10 || Chicago || United Center || 21,705 || 0–1–1 || 1
|- style="background:#cfc;"
| 3 || October 7 || Nashville || 0–4 || Pittsburgh || PPG Paints Arena || 18,645 || 1–1–1 || 3
|- style="background:#cfc;"
| 4 || October 11 || Pittsburgh || 3–2 || Washington || Capital One Arena || 18,506 || 2–1–1 || 5
|- style="background:#fcf;"
| 5 || October 12 || Pittsburgh || 4–5 || Tampa Bay || Amalie Arena || 19,092 || 2–2–1 || 5
|- style="background:#cfc;"
| 6 || October 14 || Florida || 3–4 || Pittsburgh || PPG Paints Arena || 18,582 || 3–2–1 || 7
|- style="background:#cfc;"
| 7 || October 17 || Pittsburgh || 5–4  || NY Rangers || Madison Square Garden || 18,006 || 4–2–1 || 9
|- style="background:#cfc;"
| 8 || October 20 || Pittsburgh || 4–3 || Florida || BB&T Center || 15,756 || 5–2–1 || 11
|- style="background:#fcf;"
| 9 || October 21 || Pittsburgh || 1–7 || Tampa Bay || Amalie Arena || 19,092 || 5–3–1 || 11
|- style="background:#cfc;"
| 10 || October 24 || Edmonton || 1–2  || Pittsburgh || PPG Paints Arena || 18,625 || 6–3–1 || 13
|- style="background:#cfc;"
| 11 || October 26 || Winnipeg || 1–2  || Pittsburgh || PPG Paints Arena || 18,445 || 7–3–1 || 15
|- style="background:#fcf;"
| 12 || October 28 || Pittsburgh || 1–2 || Minnesota || Xcel Energy Center || 19,064 || 7–4–1 || 15
|- style="background:#fcf;"
| 13 || October 29 || Pittsburgh || 1–7 || Winnipeg || Bell MTS Place || 15,321 || 7–5–1 || 15
|-

|- style="background:#cfc;"
| 14 || November 1 || Pittsburgh || 3–2 || Edmonton || Rogers Place || 18,347 || 8–5–1 || 17
|- style="background:#ffc;"
| 15 || November 2 || Pittsburgh || 1–2  || Calgary || Scotiabank Saddledome || 18,837 || 8–5–2 || 18
|- style="background:#fcf;"
| 16 || November 4 || Pittsburgh || 2–4 || Vancouver || Rogers Arena || 18,865 || 8–6–2 || 18
|- style="background:#cfc;"
| 17 || November 7 || Arizona || 1–3 || Pittsburgh || PPG Paints Arena || 18,498 || 9–6–2 || 20
|- style="background:#fcf;"
| 18 || November 10 || Pittsburgh || 1–4 || Washington || Capital One Arena || 18,506 || 9–7–2 || 20
|- style="background:#ffc;"
| 19 || November 11 || Pittsburgh || 4–5  || Nashville || Bridgestone Arena || 17,397 || 9–7–3 || 21
|- style="background:#cfc;"
| 20 || November 14 || Buffalo || 4–5  || Pittsburgh || PPG Paints Arena || 18,438 || 10–7–3 || 23
|- style="background:#cfc;"
| 21 || November 16 || Pittsburgh || 3–1 || Ottawa || Canadian Tire Centre || 17,144 || 11–7–3 || 25
|- style="background:#fcf;"
| 22 || November 18 || Chicago || 2–1 || Pittsburgh || PPG Paints Arena || 18,638 || 11–8–3 || 25
|- style="background:#fcf;"
| 23 || November 22 || Vancouver || 5–2 || Pittsburgh || PPG Paints Arena || 18,606 || 11–9–3 || 25
|- style="background:#fcf;"
| 24 || November 24 || Pittsburgh || 3–4 || Boston || TD Garden || 17,565 || 11–10–3 || 25
|- style="background:#cfc;"
| 25 || November 25 || Tampa Bay || 2–5 || Pittsburgh || PPG Paints Arena || 18,659 || 12–10–3 || 27
|- style="background:#cfc;"
| 26 || November 27 || Philadelphia || 4–5  || Pittsburgh || PPG Paints Arena || 18,505 || 13–10–3 || 29
|-

|- style="background:#cfc;"
| 27 || December 1 || Pittsburgh || 4–0 || Buffalo || KeyBank Center || 19,070 || 14–10–3 || 31
|- style="background:#cfc;"
| 28 || December 2 || Buffalo || 1–5 || Pittsburgh || PPG Paints Arena || 18,582 || 15–10–3 || 33
|- style="background:#fcf;"
| 29 || December 5 || NY Rangers || 4–3 || Pittsburgh || PPG Paints Arena || 18,414 || 15–11–3 || 33
|- style="background:#cfc;"
| 30 || December 7 || NY Islanders || 3–4  || Pittsburgh || PPG Paints Arena || 18,433 || 16–11–3 || 35
|- style="background:#fcf;"
| 31 || December 9 || Toronto || 4–3 || Pittsburgh || PPG Paints Arena || 18,658 || 16–12–3 || 35
|- style="background:#fcf;"
| 32 || December 11 || Colorado || 2–1 || Pittsburgh || PPG Paints Arena || 18,411 || 16–13–3 || 35
|- style="background:#fcf;"
| 33 || December 14 || Pittsburgh || 1–2 || Vegas || T-Mobile Arena || 18,029 || 16–14–3 || 35
|- style="background:#cfc;"
| 34 || December 16 || Pittsburgh || 4–2 || Arizona || Gila River Arena || 13,051 || 17–14–3 || 37
|- style="background:#fcf;"
| 35 || December 18 || Pittsburgh || 2–4 || Colorado || Pepsi Center || 15,824 || 17–15–3 || 37
|- style="background:#cfc;"
| 36 || December 21 || Columbus || 2–3  || Pittsburgh || PPG Paints Arena || 18,625 || 18–15–3 || 39
|- style="background:#fcf;"
| 37 || December 23 || Anaheim || 4–0 || Pittsburgh || PPG Paints Arena || 18,622 || 18–16–3 || 39
|- style="background:#cfc;"
| 38 || December 27 || Columbus || 4–5  || Pittsburgh || PPG Paints Arena || 18,652 || 19–16–3 || 41
|- style="background:#fcf;"
| 39 || December 29 || Pittsburgh || 1–2 || Carolina || PNC Arena || 17,975 || 19–17–3 || 41
|- style="background:#fcf;"
| 40 || December 31 || Pittsburgh || 1–4 || Detroit || Little Caesars Arena || 19,515 || 19–18–3 || 41
|-

|- style="background:#cfc;"
| 41 || January 2 || Pittsburgh || 5–1 || Philadelphia || Wells Fargo Center || 19,558 || 20–18–3 || 43
|- style="background:#fcf;"
| 42 || January 4 || Carolina || 4–0 || Pittsburgh || PPG Paints Arena || 18,595 || 20–19–3 || 43
|- style="background:#cfc;"
| 43 || January 5 || Pittsburgh || 4–0 || NY Islanders || Barclays Center || 13,641 || 21–19–3 || 45
|- style="background:#cfc;"
| 44 || January 7 || Boston || 5–6  || Pittsburgh || PPG Paints Arena || 18,553 || 22–19–3 || 47
|- style="background:#cfc;"
| 45 || January 13 || Detroit || 1–4 || Pittsburgh || PPG Paints Arena || 18,637 || 23–19–3 || 49
|- style="background:#cfc;"
| 46 || January 14 || NY Rangers || 2–5 || Pittsburgh || PPG Paints Arena || 18,647 || 24–19–3 || 51
|- style="background:#fcf;"
| 47 || January 17 || Pittsburgh || 3–5 || Anaheim || Honda Center || 17,291 || 24–20–3 || 51
|- style="background:#cfc;"
| 48 || January 18 || Pittsburgh || 3–1 || Los Angeles || Staples Center || 18,230 || 25–20–3 || 53
|- style="background:#fcf;"
| 49 || January 20 || Pittsburgh || 1–2 || San Jose || SAP Center || 17,562 || 25–21–3 || 53
|- style="background:#cfc;"
| 50 || January 23 || Carolina || 1–3 || Pittsburgh || PPG Paints Arena || 18,421 || 26–21–3 || 55
|- style="background:#cfc;"
| 51 || January 25 || Minnesota || 3–6 || Pittsburgh || PPG Paints Arena || 18,453 || 27–21–3 || 57
|- style="background:#cfc;"
| 52 || January 30 || San Jose || 2–5 || Pittsburgh || PPG Paints Arena || 18,469 || 28–21–3 || 59
|-

|- style="background:#cfc;"
| 53 || February 2 || Washington || 4–7 || Pittsburgh || PPG Paints Arena || 18,652 || 29–21–3 || 61
|- style="background:#fcf;"
| 54 || February 3 || Pittsburgh || 1–3 || New Jersey || Prudential Center || 16,514 || 29–22–3 || 61
|- style="background:#cfc;"
| 55 || February 6 || Vegas || 4–5 || Pittsburgh || PPG Paints Arena || 18,644 || 30–22–3 || 63
|- style="background:#ffc;"
| 56 || February 9 || Pittsburgh || 3–4  || Dallas || American Airlines Center || 18,532 || 30–22–4 || 64
|- style="background:#cfc;"
| 57 || February 11 || Pittsburgh || 4–1 || St. Louis || Scottrade Center || 18,975 || 31–22–4 || 66
|- style="background:#cfc;"
| 58 || February 13 || Ottawa || 3–6 || Pittsburgh || PPG Paints Arena || 18,448 || 32–22–4 || 68
|- style="background:#cfc;"
| 59 || February 15 || Los Angeles || 1–3 || Pittsburgh || PPG Paints Arena || 18,604 || 33–22–4 || 70
|- style="background:#cfc;"
| 60 || February 17 || Toronto || 3–5 || Pittsburgh || PPG Paints Arena || 18,647 || 34–22–4 || 72
|- style="background:#cfc;"
| 61 || February 18 || Pittsburgh || 5–2 || Columbus || Nationwide Arena || 19,100 || 35–22–4 || 74
|- style="background:#cfc;"
| 62 || February 23 || Pittsburgh || 6–1 || Carolina || PNC Arena || 18,180 || 36–22–4 || 76
|- style="background:#fcf;"
| 63 || February 24 || Pittsburgh || 5–6 || Florida || BB&T Center || 17,581 || 36–23–4 || 76 
|- style="background:#fcf;"
| 64 || February 27 || New Jersey || 3–2 || Pittsburgh || PPG Paints Arena || 18,581 || 36–24–4 || 76
|-

|- style="background:#fcf;"
| 65 || March 1 || Pittsburgh || 4–8 || Boston || TD Garden || 17,565 || 36–25–4 || 76
|- style="background:#cfc;"
| 66 || March 3 || NY Islanders || 2–3  || Pittsburgh || PPG Paints Arena || 18,661 || 37–25–4 || 78
|- style="background:#cfc;"
| 67 || March 5 || Calgary || 3–4  || Pittsburgh || PPG Paints Arena || 18,630 || 38–25–4 || 80
|- style="background:#cfc;"
| 68 || March 7 || Pittsburgh || 5–2 || Philadelphia || Wells Fargo Center || 19,624 || 39–25–4 || 82
|- style="background:#fcf;"
| 69 || March 10 || Pittsburgh || 2–5 || Toronto || Air Canada Centre || 19,504 || 39–26–4 || 82
|- style="background:#cfc;"
| 70 || March 11 || Dallas || 1–3 || Pittsburgh || PPG Paints Arena || 18,637 || 40–26–4 || 84
|- style="background:#ffc;"
| 71 || March 14 || Pittsburgh || 3–4  || NY Rangers || Madison Square Garden || 17,379 || 40–26–5 || 85
|- style="background:#cfc;"
| 72 || March 15 || Pittsburgh || 5–3 || Montreal || Bell Centre || 21,302 || 41–26–5 || 87
|- style="background:#fcf;"
| 73 || March 20 || Pittsburgh || 1–4 || NY Islanders || Barclays Center || 10,442 || 41–27–5 || 87
|- style="background:#cfc;"
| 74 || March 21 || Montreal || 3–5 || Pittsburgh || PPG Paints Arena || 18,574 || 42–27–5 || 89
|- style="background:#ffc;"
| 75 || March 23 || New Jersey || 4–3  || Pittsburgh || PPG Paints Arena || 18,658 || 42–27–6 || 90
|- style="background:#cfc;"
| 76 || March 25 || Philadelphia || 4–5  || Pittsburgh || PPG Paints Arena || 18,655 || 43–27–6 || 92
|- style="background:#fcf;"
| 77 || March 27 || Pittsburgh || 2–5 || Detroit || Little Caesars Arena || 19,515 || 43–28–6 || 92
|- style="background:#cfc;"
| 78 || March 29 || Pittsburgh || 4–3  || New Jersey || Prudential Center || 16,514 || 44–28–6 || 94
|- style="background:#cfc;"
| 79 || March 31 || Montreal || 2–5 || Pittsburgh || PPG Paints Arena || 18,636 || 45–28–6 || 96
|-

|- style="background:#fcf;"
| 80 || April 1 || Washington || 3–1 || Pittsburgh || PPG Paints Arena || 18,639 || 45–29–6 || 96
|- style="background:#cfc;"
| 81 || April 5 || Pittsburgh || 5–4  || Columbus || Nationwide Arena || 19,157 || 46–29–6 || 98
|- style="background:#cfc;"
| 82 || April 6 || Ottawa || 0–4 || Pittsburgh || PPG Paints Arena || 18,633 || 47–29–6 || 100
|-

|- style="text-align:center;"
| Legend:       = Win       = Loss       = OT/SO Loss

Detailed records
Final

Playoffs

Game log

|- style="background:#cfc;"
| 1 || April 11 || Philadelphia || 0–7 || Pittsburgh ||  || Murray || 18,556 || 1–0 || Recap
|- style="background:#fcf;"
| 2 || April 13 || Philadelphia || 5–1 || Pittsburgh ||  || Murray || 18,648 || 1–1 || Recap
|- style="background:#cfc;"
| 3 || April 15 || Pittsburgh || 5–1 || Philadelphia ||  || Murray || 19,955 || 2–1 || Recap
|- style="background:#cfc;"
| 4 || April 18 || Pittsburgh || 5–0 || Philadelphia ||  || Murray || 19,644 || 3–1 || Recap
|- style="background:#fcf;"
| 5 || April 20 || Philadelphia || 4–2 || Pittsburgh ||  || Murray || 18,632 || 3–2 || Recap
|- style="background:#cff;"
| 6 || April 22 || Pittsburgh || 8–5 || Philadelphia ||  || Murray || 19,861 || 4–2 || Recap
|-

|- style="background:#cfc;"
| 1 || April 26 || Pittsburgh || 3–2 || Washington ||  || Murray || 18,506 || 1–0 || Recap
|- style="background:#fcf;"
| 2 || April 29 || Pittsburgh || 1–4 || Washington ||  || Murray || 18,506 || 1–1 || Recap
|- style="background:#fcf;"
| 3 || May 1 || Washington || 4–3 || Pittsburgh ||  || Murray || 18,634 || 1–2 || Recap
|- style="background:#cfc;"
| 4 || May 3 || Washington || 1–3 || Pittsburgh ||  || Murray || 18,650 || 2–2 || Recap
|- style="background:#fcf;"
| 5 || May 5 || Pittsburgh || 3–6 || Washington ||  || Murray || 18,506 || 2–3 || Recap
|- style="background:#fcf;"
| 6 || May 7 || Washington || 2–1 || Pittsburgh || OT || Murray || 18,621 || 2–4 || Recap
|-

|-
| Legend:       = Win       = Loss       = Playoff series win

Player statistics
Final
Skaters

 Team Total includes Skater Statistics, Goaltender Statistics and Bench Minor Penalties.

Goaltenders

†Denotes player spent time with another team before joining the Penguins. Statistics reflect time with the Penguins only.
‡Denotes player was traded mid-season. Statistics reflect time with the Penguins only.
Bold/italics denotes franchise record.

Notable achievements

Awards

Team awards 
Awarded week of April 1

Milestones

Transactions
The Penguins have been involved in the following transactions during the 2017–18 season.

Trades

Notes:
 The Vegas Golden Knights will select Marc-Andre Fleury in the 2017 NHL Expansion Draft.
 Vegas to retain 40% ($2 million) of salary as part of trade.

Free agents

Waivers

Signings

Notes
  – Two-way contract
  – Entry-level contract

Draft picks

Below are the Pittsburgh Penguins' selections at the 2017 NHL Entry Draft, which was held on June 23 and 24, 2017 at the United Center in Chicago.

Draft notes:
 The St. Louis Blues' second-round pick went to the Pittsburgh Penguins as the result of a trade on June 23, 2017, that sent Oskar Sundqvist and a first-round pick in 2017 (31st overall) to St. Louis in exchange for Ryan Reaves and this pick.
 The Ottawa Senators' fifth-round pick went to the Pittsburgh Penguins as the result of a trade on November 2, 2016, that Mike Condon to Ottawa exchange for this pick.

References

Pittsburgh Penguins seasons
Pittsburgh Penguins
Pitts
Pitts